Echinops ritro, the southern globethistle, is a species of flowering plant in the family Asteraceae, native to southern and eastern Europe (from Spain east to Turkey, Ukraine, and Belarus), and western Asia. The species is sparingly naturalized in scattered locations in Canada and the United States.

Echinops ritro  and the subspecies E. ritro subsp. ruthenicus have gained the Royal Horticultural Society's Award of Garden Merit.

Subspecies
Echinops ritro subsp. meyeri (DC.) Kožuharov
Echinops ritro subsp. ritro
Echinops ritro subsp. ruthenicus (M.Bieb.) Nyman
Echinops ritro subsp. sartorianus (Boiss. & Heldr.) Kožuharov
Echinops ritro subsp. siculus (Strobl) Greuter
Echinops ritro subsp. thracicus (Velen.) Kožuharov

References

ritro
Plants described in 1753
Taxa named by Carl Linnaeus
Flora of Europe
Flora of Asia